Célestin Sieur (La Chapelle-en-Lafaye, 27 December 1860 – Paris, 12 June 1955) was a French physician specializing in ENT surgery. The Sieur's sign is named after him.

References

External links
 
Biography
Biography 
Biography
Biography

1860 births
1955 deaths
French otolaryngologists
Physicians from Paris
University of Bordeaux alumni